"Bonnie & Clyde" is a duet by German recording artists Sarah Connor and Henning Wehland. It was recorded for the reissued deluxe edition of Connor's ninth studio album Muttersprache (2016).

Formats and track listings

Charts

Weekly charts

Certifications

References

External links
  
 

2016 singles
2016 songs
Sarah Connor (singer) songs
Songs written by Sarah Connor (singer)
Polydor Records singles